SMS S13 was a V1-class torpedo boat of the Imperial German Navy. The ship was built by Schichau-Werke, at their Elbing shipyard, completing in 1912. She served in the First World War with the German High Seas Fleet, taking part in the Battle of the Heligoland Bight in 1914. She was sunk by an accidental explosion on 6 November 1914.

Construction and design
In 1911, the Imperial German Navy decided to break the pattern of each year's orders of torpedo boats being a development of the previous year's designs, as it felt that they were getting too big to work for the fleet, and instead the 12 torpedo boats (six each ordered from AG Vulcan and Germaniawerft) (the V1-class) were smaller than those ordered in recent years in order to be more manoeuvrable and so work better with the fleet. This change resulted in the numbering series for torpedo boats being restarted. The 1912 programme placed orders for a flotilla of 12 torpedo boats of similar design (S13 to ) with Schichau-Werke. The reduction in size resulted in the ships' seaworthiness being adversely affected, however, with the 1911 and 1912 torpedo boats acquiring the disparaging nickname "Admiral Lans' cripples".

S13s armament consisted of two  SK L/30 naval guns in single mounts fore and aft, together with four 50 cm (19.7 in) torpedo tubes with one reload torpedo carried. Up to 18 mines could be carried. The ship had a crew of 74 officers and other ranks.

Construction and service

S13, yard number 864, was launched at Schichau's shipyard in Elbing, East Prussia (now Elbląg in Poland) on 7 December 1911 and was commissioned on 2 July 1912.

First World War
On 28 August 1914, a British force of destroyers and cruisers supported by battlecruisers made a sortie into the Heligoland Bight in order to ambush German torpedo boats on patrol, which caused the Battle of Heligoland Bight. The German 5th Torpedo Boat Flotilla, including S13, were sent out from Heligoland to investigate sightings of British submarines (which were deployed as bait to draw out German ships), and ran into several British destroyers. The flotilla then turned away to try and escape the trap, but S13 and the torpedo boat  could not make full speed and lagged behind the rest of the flotilla, V2, which was closer to the British ships than S13, attracted most of the fire of the British destroyers, and was hit twice by British shells before the arrival of the German cruiser  allowed the 5th Flotilla to escape. S13 was undamaged, and later assisted the badly damaged , leader of the 3rd Minesweeping Flotilla. In total, however, three German light cruisers (and ) and one torpedo boat of the German outer screen had been sunk.

On 6 November 1914 S13 was sunk in the North Sea when one of her own torpedoes exploded. Nine of S13s crew were killed.

Notes

References

Bibliography

 
 

Torpedo boats of the Imperial German Navy
1911 ships
World War I torpedo boats of Germany
V1-class destroyers
Ships built in Elbing
Ships built by Schichau
Maritime incidents in November 1914
World War I shipwrecks in the North Sea